Mogila is a village in the municipality of Klokot, Kosovo.

Geography 
The village is located on the foothills of the Karadak Mountains, It borders the village of Gjylekar in the west and Viti in the west.

Notable People 

 Njazi Azemi

Notes and references 
Notes:

References:

References 

Villages in Viti, Kosovo